Gąsiorowo  is a village in the Gmina Izbica Kujawska administrative district in Włocławek County, Kuyavian-Pomeranian Voivodeship, north central Poland.

References

Villages in Włocławek County